Microjazz is a long-running series of sheet music publications by New Zealand-born British pianist and composer Christopher Norton. The series is published by Boosey & Hawkes.
Based on classical technique yet using popular contemporary styles such as jazz, blues, rock 'n' roll and funk, Microjazz aims to "develop musicianship and technique through the familiar sounds and styles of popular music". The series has established itself as a leading educational music series around the world, and has expanded over 20 years to include music for all of the major instruments with piano, ensemble books and midi file backings. It is now the biggest selling music series for Boosey & Hawkes, with over a million sales to date.

External links 
Official Microjazz webpage published by Boosey & Hawkes
Composer's own website

British music
Music education
Sheet music